Die Matie is a student newspaper at the University of Stellenbosch. Founded in 1941, Die Matie is published every second Wednesday during the academic term. The editorial content includes sections on news, student life, sport, arts and entertainment, current affairs and news from other campuses. The entire production of Die Matie – from photos, articles and advertisements to page layout and distribution – is managed by the editorial staff; all students.

History 
On August 1, 1941, the first issue of Die Matie student newspaper was published in Stellenbosch.

Distribution 
8,000 copies of the newspaper are distributed on the main campus of Stellenbosch, as well as on the three satellite campuses, the medical campus at Tygerberg, military campus at Saldanha and business school in Bellville. Die Matie has an estimated readership of 16 000 students, staff and Stellenbosch residents. In addition to print the paper is also published electronically though an online archive.

Structure 
With every edition of Die Matie a pre-elected editorial team member has the responsibility of compiling a supplement, either on: motoring, lifestyle, travel, science & technology and health.
The editor of this supplement is expected to gather advertisements for the supplement (as ads pay for the printing of the supplement), the collection of editorial content, photos and for the layout of the supplement.

Financing 
Although Die Matie receives a small subsidy from Stellenbosch University's Student Affairs Department, all printing costs and some of the office upkeep is covered by advertisements, which are the responsibility of Die Maties advertising manager (also a student and member of the editorial team).

See also
 List of newspapers in South Africa
MFM 92.6, Stellenbosch University's radio station

External links 
 Official Homepage 
 Official Online Archive
 Stellenbosch University Homepage
 Student Representative Council
 The full history 

Student newspapers published in South Africa
Stellenbosch University
Afrikaans-language newspapers
Mass media in Stellenbosch
1941 establishments in South Africa